Mitamura (written: 三田村) is a Japanese surname. Notable people with the surname include:

, Japanese ice hockey player
, Japanese actor and singer

Japanese-language surnames